The Farmington Canal Heritage Trail is an  multi-use rail trail located in Connecticut and Massachusetts.

The trail was built on former New Haven and Northampton Company (NH&N) (later New York, New Haven and Hartford Railroad [NH]) railbed, which was constructed along the route of the Farmington Canal in Connecticut and the Hampshire and Hampden Canal in Massachusetts, respectively.

The sections from New Haven to Tariffville totaling  are part of the East Coast Greenway, a 32 percent completed trail intended to link Maine with Florida.

Railroad history
In 1821, a group of New Haven businessmen convened to construct a canal in Connecticut much like the Erie Canal was under construction in New York. It took ten years to complete and was open for use in 1835. Twelve years later, rail became the more cost efficient transportation option and facilitator of trade. A rail bed was put down to follow the same route that the canal had.

The line changed hands throughout its lifetime, from the NH&N, NH, Penn Central, Conrail, and finally Guilford, who abandoned the line in segments throughout the 1980s. The Connecticut Department of Transportation purchased most of the line from Guilford for railbanking purposes. In 1991, the Intermodal Surface Transportation Efficiency Act (ISTEA) provided states the ability to utilize federal funds to finance the conversion of derelict railroad corridors into rail trails.

The trail runs from downtown New Haven, Connecticut, to Northampton, Massachusetts, closely following the path of the original Canal and Route 10.

Portions of the original canal still exist, such as an historic "lock house" dating from the time of the original canal, as well as retaining walls, canal locks (elevators for boats), old sections of canal, and other features. In Cheshire, Connecticut, the only restored lock along the original Canal line has been incorporated into the Lock 12 Historical Park.

Trail status
The route of the Farmington Canal Heritage Trail is not yet completed (85% in Connecticut, 63% in Massachusetts). The trail is divided into three sections: 
 southern: New Haven-Plainville, Connecticut
 middle: Farmington-Suffield, Connecticut
 northern: Southwick, Massachusetts-Northampton, Massachusetts (In Southwick, the trail is known as the Southwick Rail Trail; in Westfield, it is known as the Columbia Heritage Rail Trail.)

Southern section
As of October 2018, one continuous section runs from Yale University to Lazy Lane in Southington, a distance of 25 miles. The northern part of Southington is being designed for construction up to Town Line Road in 2023. The last gap is the northern section of 5.3 miles through Plainville.

Middle section
As of October 2018, the trail extends uninterrupted from Northwest Drive in Northern Plainville to the Massachusetts border in Suffield, 24.6 miles.

Northern section
As of October 2018, the Southwick rail trail in Massachusetts in complete, while the trail in Westfield is complete to Main Street, totaling 8.5 miles. There is a gap extending from north of Westfield Center through Southampton of 8.4 miles. The rest of the trail is complete through Easthampton into Northampton 7.3 miles. State funding for design of a  section in Southampton was awarded in 2022.

Farmington Canal State Park Trail 

Farmington Canal State Park Trail forms a portion of the Farmington Canal Heritage Trail in the towns of Cheshire and Hamden. The site of the greenway was originally used by the native Quinnipiac tribes as a path prior to its expansion as a road by the colonists. A canal construction project began on July 4, 1825, with the first sections opening in 1828. On June 22, 1836, the Farmington and Hampshire companies were in debt and transferred their ownership to New Haven-Northampton Company, resulting in a loss of more than $1 million in investor capital. In 1847, investors in the company petitioned the state for the right to build a railroad. The approved railroad was constructed in one year on the banks of the canal for a total cost of $186,000.33. Rail service lasted until the 1980s, when Guilford discontinued service. The Farmington Valley Trails Council was founded in 1992 to preserve the canal by converting it into a park. Part of the Farmington Canal State Park trail was dedicated May 22, 1994. Located on North Brooksvale road is Lock 12 Historical Park, a restored canal lock and museum dubbed the "best-preserved relic of Connecticut's canal era."

References

External links

 Farmington Canal Heritage Trail and Farmington River Trail | Farmington Valley Trails Council
 Farmington Canal Rail to Trail Association (southern portion of the trail)

  

Rail trails in Connecticut
Rail trails in Massachusetts
East Coast Greenway
Farmington, Connecticut
Tourist attractions in Hartford County, Connecticut
Protected areas of New Haven County, Connecticut
Tourist attractions in New Haven, Connecticut
Heritage trails